Days Like These is a British TV remake of the popular American sitcom That '70s Show. Directed by Bob Spiers, it was broadcast Fridays at 8.30 pm on ITV in 1999 and used many of the same names (Eric Forman, Kitty Forman), or slight alterations (Donna Palmer instead of Donna Pinciotti, Jackie Burget instead of Jackie Burkhart, etc.). It was set in the real-life town of Luton, England, in the 1970s. It was cancelled after six episodes and only 10 of the 13 produced episodes were aired.

Cast 
 Max Wrottesley as Eric Forman
 Trevor Cooper as Ron Forman (Red Forman)
 Ann Bryson as Kitty Forman
 Rosie Marcel as Donna Palmer (Donna Pinciotti)
 Steve Steen as Bob Palmer (Bob Pinciotti)
 Sara Stockbridge as Midge Palmer (Midge Pinciotti)
 Harry Peacock as Dylan Jones (Steven Hyde)
 James Carlton as Michael McGuire (Michael Kelso)
 Emma Pierson as Jackie Burget (Jackie Burkhart)
 Jamie Beck as Torbjørn Rasmussen (Fez)

References

External links 

 
 Review of first episode of Days Like These

1999 British television series debuts
1999 British television series endings
1990s British sitcoms
Dunstable
English-language television shows
ITV sitcoms
Television series set in the 1970s
Television shows set in Bedfordshire
Television series by Carsey-Werner Productions
British television series based on American television series
Television series created by Bonnie and Terry Turner
Television series created by Mark Brazill
Television series created by Linda Wallem
Television series created by Caryn Mandabach
That '70s Show